

I

I